Greenwich Academy is an independent, college-preparatory day school for girls in Greenwich, Connecticut. Founded in 1827, it is the oldest girls' school in Connecticut. Greenwich Academy's motto is Ad Ingenium Faciendum, "Toward the Building of Character."

The head of school is Molly H. King.

History

Greenwich Academy was founded by members of the Congregational Church in 1827. Until the turn of the twentieth century, the school admitted both girls and boys. Then, in 1900, a Greenwich Academy English teacher founded the Brunswick School for Boys. In 1913, the Greenwich Academy Board of Trustees formally approved the decision to accept only girls in the Middle and Upper Schools, and Greenwich Academy was reconceived as a day school for girls.

The newly chartered school was led by strong female educators, including Ruth West Campbell, who shaped much of the mission and philosophy of the school. Succeeding heads — Katherine Zierleyn, Alexander A. Uhle and Patsy G. Howard — oversaw growth in the facilities and student body and expanded the academic and extracurricular offerings. In July 2004, Molly H. King was appointed as head.

Coordination 
Since 1971, Greenwich Academy has had a coordinated relationship with the all-boys Brunswick School. Brunswick's upper school is located across the street from GA and high school students take classes on both campuses. As a result, almost all high school classes at GA and Brunswick are co-ed. Together the two high schools offer more than 400 sections of ~200 courses, with 80+ honors and advanced placement classes.

Signature programs

Engineering & Design Lab 
Greenwich Academy's Engineering & Design Lab (EDL) was established in 2013. It is a fully equipped, digital fabrication space with machines including 3D printers, laser cutters, vinyl cutters, and CNC machines. In addition to digital manufacturing capabilities, the space offers carpentry and hand-building tools, microcontrollers, electronics, and a wide variety of materials for building. Students and faculty across divisions have access to the space and support for their projects. The lab's director, Erin Riley, is a Senior FabLearn Fellow out of Stanford University's Transformative Learning Technologies Lab.

GAINS (Girls Advancing in STEM) Network 
The GAINS (Girls Advancing in STEM) Network was founded by Greenwich Academy in 2011 to provide an online social platform for young women interested in science, technology, engineering and math.

Since 2015, the GAINS Conference has been held each spring in partnership with universities and corporations. The three-day conferences have been held at MIT (2015), Duke University and University of North Carolina at Chapel Hill (2016), Silicon Valley (2017), New York City at the offices of Oath (2018), and University of Pennsylvania (2019).

Daedalus Art and Literary Magazine 
Daedalus, Greenwich Academy's art and literary magazine was established in 1986 and has earned 22 Gold Medalists from the Columbia Scholastic Press Association, 15 Highest Awards from the National Council of Teachers of English, and 14 Crowns from the Columbia Scholastic Press Association.

Notable alumnae 

 Hagar Chemali, Political Satirist, Writer, Producer, Television Personality, and Political Commentator
 Jane Fonda, model and actress.
 Shelley Hack, supermodel and Charlie's Angels actress
 Jean Holzworth, veterinarian
 Radhika Jones, editor-in-chief, Vanity Fair Magazine
 Ethel Kennedy, human rights activist and widow of Senator Robert F. Kennedy.
 Lauren Redniss, Visual Storyteller and MacArthur Fellow.
 Kelly Rohrbach, model and actress.
 Maia Shibutani, Olympic ice dancer.
 Allison Williams, actress, comedian, and singer.

References

External links
 
 GAINS (Girls Advancing in STEM) Network

Schools in Greenwich, Connecticut
Girls' schools in Connecticut
Educational institutions established in 1827
Private high schools in Connecticut
Private middle schools in Connecticut
1827 establishments in Connecticut